Maksym Slyusar (born 1 July 1997) is a professional Ukrainian football midfielder.

Career
Slusar is the product of the FC Zorya Luhansk youth system.

He continued his career in the Ukrainian Premier League Reserves, but never was promoted to the main-team squad and in December 2015 he was excluded from the team among other players, as he was suspected of participating in match fixing. In March 2017 he signed a contract with Belarusian side Slavia Mozyr.

References

External links 

1997 births
Living people
Footballers from Luhansk
Ukrainian footballers
Association football midfielders
FC Zorya Luhansk players
FC Slavia Mozyr players
Expatriate footballers in Belarus
Ukrainian expatriate footballers
Ukrainian expatriate sportspeople in Belarus